The following is a list of the 499 communes of the Meuse department of France.

The communes cooperate in the following intercommunalities (as of 2020):
Communauté d'agglomération de Bar-le-Duc - Sud Meuse
Communauté d'agglomération du Grand Verdun
Communauté de communes de l'Aire à l'Argonne
Communauté de communes Argonne-Meuse
Communauté de communes Cœur du Pays-Haut (partly)
Communauté de communes de Commercy - Void - Vaucouleurs
Communauté de communes Côtes de Meuse - Woëvre
Communauté de communes de Damvillers Spincourt
Communauté de communes du Pays d'Étain
Communauté de communes du Pays de Montmédy
Communauté de communes du Pays de Revigny-sur-Ornain
Communauté de communes du Pays de Stenay et du Val Dunois
Communauté de communes des Portes de Meuse
Communauté de communes du Sammiellois
Communauté de communes du Territoire de Fresnes-en-Woëvre
Communauté de communes Val de Meuse - Voie Sacrée

References

Meuse